Jesse Smith may refer to:

Sports
Jesse Smith (water polo) (born 1983), water polo player for the United States at the 2004 Summer Olympics
Jesse D. Smith (born 1986), Australian rules footballer with the Carlton Football Club
Jesse W. Smith (born 1986), former Australian rules footballer with the North Melbourne and St Kilda Football Clubs
Jesse Smith (racing driver) (born 1989), American racing driver

Music
Jesse Smith, daughter of Patti Smith
Jesse Smith (musician), drummer for Christian metalcore band Zao

Others
Jess Smith (Jesse W. Smith, 1871–1923), American political functionary
Jesse C. Smith (1808–1888), New York lawyer and politician, Union Army general
Jesse N. Smith (1834–1906), pioneer of the Mormon religion
Jesse Merrick Smith (1848–1927), American mechanical engineer

See also
Jessie Smith (disambiguation)
Jessica Smith (disambiguation)
Jesse Smyth, character in the 2006 film Kenny